Brownlee is an unincorporated community in Baker County, Oregon, United States.

John Brownlee started a ferry service that crossed the Snake River between Idaho and Oregon that became known as Brownlee's Ferry. When a railroad was built on the Oregon side of the river, the station at the ferry crossing was named Brownlee. Brownlee post office ran intermittently from 1910 to 1965. The portion of the tracks that ran between Homestead and Robinette and passed through Brownlee were torn up by the railway's final owners Oregon Short Line in 1934.

See also
Brownlee Dam
Goodale's Cutoff
Historic ferries in Oregon

References

Unincorporated communities in Baker County, Oregon
Ghost towns in Oregon
1910 establishments in Oregon
Populated places established in 1910
Unincorporated communities in Oregon